A  (child of the defense of the Law) is a type of guardian spirit from Japanese Buddhist folklore devoted to serving followers of the dharma.  In classic stories from medieval collections such as the Uji Shui Monogatari, it is generally depicted as a young boy wearing a collar of swords, with a large sword in one hand and a noose in the other.  It flies through the air by riding a Wheel of Dharma.

See also
 Dharmapala
 Four Kumaras – A group of semi-divine sage boys in Hinduism
 Fudō-myōō
 Putto – In Greco-Roman mythology and Renaissance Christian art
 Shikigami

Sources
Blacker, Carmen (1963). "The Divine Boy in Japanese Buddhism". Asian Folklore Studies, vol. 22. Nanzan University.

Buddhist legendary creatures
Dharmapalas
Japanese legendary creatures
Buddhism and children